The Club Atlético Excursionistas stadium does not have an official name, and is thus simply referred to as Estadio de Excursionistas or colloquially as Pampa y Miñones or El Coliseo del Bajo Belgrano.

The stadium was built in 1911 in the traditional Buenos Aires neighborhood of Belgrano (more specifically what is known as "Bajo Belgrano"), and it comprises the full block between streets La Pampa, Miñones, Migueletes and José Hernández. The stadium's address is La Pampa 1376 for the press and general public, and Miñones 1780 for players and referees.

History 
Excursionistas is the only club affiliated to the Argentine Football Association that has never relocated its stadium, making it a unique and historic venue.

The stadium was officially inaugurated on April 14, 1912, on the occasion of a third division match between Excursionistas and club Libertad. Excursio went on to win the match 4–0.

The stadium currently has a capacity of 7,200 spectators. In 2014 it underwent significant renovations, including a new "FIFA QUALITY PRO Artificial Turf" artificial surface (the first to be approved by the Argentine Football Association for competition), an improved lighting system, new dressing rooms and club and medical facilities.

Sports venues completed in 1912